Wilson is a suburb of Perth, Western Australia, located within the City of Canning on the north bank of the Canning River. It is a fairly old suburb with parks and close proximity to prominent shopping centres in South Perth. It is favoured by Curtin University students, the reason being its convenient access to the university. Bus numbers 72 and 75 travel through this suburb.  The suburb contains Castledare, Kent Street Weir, Canning River and Lo Quay River Cafe.

References

External links

Suburbs of Perth, Western Australia
Canning River (Western Australia)
Suburbs in the City of Canning